The following lists events that happened during 1885 in Liberia.

Incumbents
President: Hilary R. W. Johnson 
Vice President: James Thompson
Chief Justice: C. L. Parsons

Events

March
 Full Date Unknown – Great Britain seizes Liberian territory west of the Mano River, and it becomes part of the Colony of Sierra Leone.

May
 May 5 - Liberian general election, 1885

References

 
Years of the 19th century in Liberia
Liberia
Liberia